Sporting Clube de Portugal, commonly known as Sporting CP or Sporting Portugal, is a professional basketball team based in Lisbon, Portugal, which represents the sport's section within parent club Sporting CP.

The team competes in the Liga Portuguesa de Basquetebol (LPB), the top-tier domestic league, and plays its home matches at Pavilhão João Rocha. The current head coach is Luís Magalhães.

History
Basketball was introduced in Sporting Clube de Portugal in 1927.

In 1995, basketball stopped being one of the sports practiced in the club, returning in 2012, just with the women's team.

In 2019, the men's team was refounded after 24 years. Sporting submitted a proposal to go directly into the 2019–20 Liga Portuguesa de Basquetebol with their men's team. In a league meeting in November of 2018 between all the league teams, Sporting's acceptance into the LPB was confirmed.

Facilities

Pavilhão João Rocha
Pavilhão João Rocha is a multi-sports pavilion located in the parish of Lumiar, in Lisbon. Located next to the Estádio José Alvalade, it is the home of Sporting CP sports. In honor of one of the most distinguished figures in the history of Sporting, the pavilion was named after former club president, João Rocha, who remained in office from September 1973 to October 1986. Its inauguration took place on the day June 21, 2017.

Honours
 Portuguese League
 Winners (9): 1953/54, 1955/56, 1959/60, 1968/69, 1975/76, 1977/78, 1980/81, 1981/82, 2020/21

 Portuguese Cup
 Winners (8): 1954/55, 1974/75, 1975/76, 1977/78, 1979/80, 2019/20, 2020/21, 2021/22

 Portuguese Supercup 
 Winners (2): 2021, 2022

 Portuguese League Cup
 Winners (2): 2022, 2023

Current roster

References

External links
Sporting CP Official Website
Sporting in zerozero.pt

Sporting CP sports
Basketball teams in Portugal
Basketball teams established in 1927
1927 establishments in Portugal